Pilawa railway station is a railway station at Pilawa, Garwolin, Masovian, Poland. It is served by Koleje Mazowieckie.

Train services
The station is served by the following service(s):

 Intercity services (IC) Łódź Fabryczna — Warszawa — Lublin Główny
 Intercity services (IC) Kołobrzeg - Piła - Bydgoszcz - Warszawa - Lublin - Hrubieszów 
Intercity services (TLK) Kołobrzeg — Gdynia Główna — Warszawa Wschodnia — Kraków Główny''

References 

Station article at kolej.one.pl

External links

Railway stations in Warsaw